Stephen Harold McCall (born 15 October 1960) is an English retired footballer who now works as a Scout for Carlisle United.

A defensive midfielder during his playing days, McCall built a reputation as a cultured midfield player, with immaculate passing ability. He began his career with Ipswich Town and quickly progressed to the first team under the management of Bobby Robson. McCall helped the club win the UEFA Cup in 1981, and he went on to win six England U21 caps during the next year. He left Portman Road in 1987, having made more than 300 appearances for the club, to join Sheffield Wednesday. His time with them was blighted by injury, and he spent time on loan with his home town club, Carlisle United in 1990. Two years later, he joined Plymouth Argyle and became a key player for Peter Shilton's side. He won the club's Player of the Year award in his first two full seasons at Home Park.

He briefly managed the club in 1995 following the departure of Shilton and stayed on as a member of the playing squad when Neil Warnock was appointed. He then moved to Torquay United in 1996 as a player-coach for Kevin Hodges and returned to Home Park two years later with Hodges. He went into non-league football in 2000 with Workington, where he finished his playing career. Following retirement, he returned to Ipswich Town, initially as a scout and then as a coach. Under the management of Paul Jewell, he was made chief scout but left the club in July 2014. In September 2014 he joined Colchester United in a similar role.

In February 2022 he was appointed as a scout for Carlisle United.

Playing career

Ipswich Town
He made his name at Ipswich Town, where his greatest achievement was winning the UEFA Cup in the 1980/81 season, beating AZ Alkmaar 5–4 on aggregate, with McCall playing an influential part in his team's victory. He grabbed his opportunity in the 1st team, when George Burley was side-lined through injury for several months. 
He joined Ipswich in 1978 as an apprentice, being scouted from the north-west where Town legend Kevin Beattie was also born, and went on to make 329 appearances for Town, standing as a club record of consecutive appearances until 2001, being beaten by the goalkeeper Richard Wright. During this time he received one B cap against New Zealand. McCall scored 11 goals in his 9 seasons at Ipswich before he was sold for £300,000 to Sheffield Wednesday.

Sheffield Wednesday
His time at Sheffield Wednesday was less successful, as he spent much of his 4 seasons sidelined with a range of injuries, limiting his collection of appearances to only 36, scoring only 2 goals. In the midst of an unfortunate run at Wednesday, McCall achieved a childhood dream by being loaned to his hometown team Carlisle United, where he spent only a few months making 6 appearances without a goal. He contributed 5 appearances to Wednesday's run in the 1990–91 Football League Cup, but was not part of the match day squad as they won the final.

Plymouth Argyle
Towards the end of the 1991–92 season, McCall was sold to Plymouth Argyle for £25,000. He was named the club's player of the season two years in a row in 1993 and 1994, only the second player in Argyle's history to achieve such a title (the other being Paul Mariner, one of McCall's ex-teammates). As if given a new lease of life, McCall enjoyed a period of rich form in his two occasions at Plymouth, making 275 appearances in 6 years at the club. In 1995 McCall enjoyed a short reign as Plymouth's caretaker manager before he was replaced by Neil Warnock.

Torquay United
Sandwiched between his two spells at Plymouth, McCall joined Torquay United for free from 12 July 1996 to 24 June 1998, joining his former Plymouth teammate and manager Kevin Hodges in Torquay United's management team. In the 1997–98 season, McCall lived another childhood ambition – to play at Wembley, when Torquay played out a close fought match against Colchester United. The dream of playoff glory was short lived however, as the favourites for promotion were beaten 1–0 by a Colchester penalty. The close season saw Plymouth's manager Mick Jones lose his job, and Hodges and McCall took the position at their former club, in a reign that lasted a further two years.

Return to Plymouth Argyle
McCall's playing career ended in 2000 at Plymouth Argyle. He appeared in the famous Jimmy Glass game against his hometown club Carlisle, in which the goalkeeper scored in the 94th minute to keep Carlisle United in the Football League.

Coaching career
In 2001, McCall hooked up with his former teammate and close friend George Burley as a European scouting co-ordinator at Ipswich Town, and progressed through the ranks initially as a scout, and when Joe Royle took over, became the Reserve Team Manager and the First Team Coach. He currently works as a chief scout for Colchester United working for another ex-Ipswich Town player John McGreal.

Career statistics

International

Honours

As a player
Ipswich Town
UEFA Cup: 1981

Sheffield Wednesday
Football League Cup: 1991

Individual
Plymouth Argyle Player of the Year: 1992–93, 1993–94
Ipswich Town Hall of Fame: Inducted 2017

References

External links

1960 births
Living people
Footballers from Carlisle, Cumbria
English footballers
England B international footballers
England under-21 international footballers
Ipswich Town F.C. players
Sheffield Wednesday F.C. players
Carlisle United F.C. players
Plymouth Argyle F.C. players
Torquay United F.C. players
Workington A.F.C. players
Plymouth Argyle F.C. non-playing staff
Association football midfielders
UEFA Cup winning players